This is a list of individuals who were former or serving Members of Parliament for the House of Commons of the United Kingdom who died in the 2000s.

2000

2001

2002

2003

2004

2005

2006

2007

2008

2009

See also

 List of United Kingdom MPs who died in the 1990s
List of United Kingdom MPs who died in the 2010s
 List of United Kingdom MPs who died in the 2020s

Died in the 2000s
2000s politics-related lists